Alexander Tumay (born July 19, 1986) is an American audio engineer and DJ from Atlanta, Georgia. He has recorded and mixed songs for major artists across the American hip hop industry, including Young Thug, Travis Scott, Future, Kanye West, Drake, and 21 Savage. He won a Grammy award for engineering the track "This is America" by Childish Gambino.

Early life
Alexander Tumay was born on July 19, 1986, in Queens, New York City, New York. He is of Armenian and Puerto Rican descent. He was raised in Fort Lauderdale, Florida, for most of his teen years. He learned to play piano and guitar growing up, as Tumay's father is a classical pianist, which influenced him to do so. He also listened to hip hop and heavy metal. He was in his high school's band and in small garage bands.

Tumay could not find a major for college to satisfy his wants, and went through eight or nine majors in total before he dropped out. He was later working at restaurant jobs. One of these was a pizza delivery driver for Domino's Pizza. One of Tumay's friends introduced him to Logic Pro, a digital audio workstation program. He was interested in the program, but he could not figure out how to use it at the time so, one month later, he enrolled in Full Sail University in Winter Park, Florida to study audio engineering. Tumay graduated from the Full Sail in 2010 with a bachelor's degree in recording arts, and then scored an internship at Maze Studios in Atlanta, Georgia, to where he later relocated, and worked frequently with another record producer, Ben H. Allen, who taught Tumay more about recording and mixing for an additional three years. He also assisted Allen on projects for the experimental pop band Animal Collective and experimental musician Youth Lagoon, before fully going into working in the hip hop genre.

Career
Tumay visited many recording studios around Atlanta with his résumé looking for another internship, and got one as a technician at DARP Studios (later renamed as UAMG Studios) through his manager, Monica Tannian, due to his work with Allen. As he was in DARP Studios often, he got the opportunity to work with major artists such as T.I., Waka Flocka Flame, PartyNextDoor, and Tinashe, among others. In 2012, he met Metro Boomin at UAMG Studios, which lead to Tumay working with more artists and record producers such as Young Thug, Rich Homie Quan, Migos, DJ Spinz, Southside, TM88, 808 Mafia, Sonny Digital, and many more.

Tumay is Young Thug's personal and most trusted recording and mixing engineer. He met Thug in early 2013, and the first song they worked together on was "Some More" from Metro Boomin's debut mixtape 19 & Boomin' , on which he also mixed most of the songs and executive produced it. Metro approached Tumay and asked him to record that song due to Thug having issues with his former recording and mixing engineer, whom Thug removed from that studio session. Tumay has been working with Thug closely ever since, as well with Metro Boomin and more recently, 21 Savage, for which Tumay recently recorded and mixed their debut EP, Savage Mode.

Selected engineering discography

 19 and Boomin – Metro Boomin
 Days Before Rodeo – Travis Scott
 Rodeo – Travis Scott
 Barter 6 – Young Thug
 Slime Season – Young Thug
 Slime Season 2 – Young Thug
 I'm Up – Young Thug
 Paperwork – T.I.
 Remember My Name – Lil Durk
 Slime Season 3 – Young Thug

 The Life of Pablo – Kanye West
 Savage Mode – Metro Boomin and 21 Savage
 Jeffery – Young Thug
 Beautiful Thugger Girls – Young Thug
 Issa Album – 21 Savage
 Camila – Camila Cabello
 Slime Language – Young Thug
 On the Rvn – Young Thug
 So Much Fun – Young Thug
 "Sum Bout U" – 645AR featuring FKA Twigs

Production discography

2015

Young Thug – Slime Season 2
 22. "Love Me Forever (Chopped & Screwed)"

References

External links
 

People from Atlanta
Living people
Musicians from Atlanta
Musicians from Fort Lauderdale, Florida
American hip hop record producers
American audio engineers
Southern hip hop musicians
20th-century American guitarists
21st-century American guitarists
1986 births
Guitarists from Florida
Guitarists from Georgia (U.S. state)
Guitarists from New York City
American male guitarists
Engineers from New York City
American male pianists
21st-century American pianists
Record producers from New York (state)
20th-century American male musicians
21st-century American male musicians